Offroad.TV is a German television series.

See also
List of German television series

External links
 

2001 German television series debuts
2001 German television series endings
Television series about journalism
German-language television shows
Das Erste original programming